Sasykoli is a rural locality (a selo) and the administrative center of Sasykolsky Selsoviet, Kharabalinsky District, Astrakhan Oblast, Russia. The population was 5,224 as of 2010. There are 70 streets.

Geography 
Sasykoli is located on the Ashuluk River, 29 km northwest of Kharabali (the district's administrative centre) by road. Kochkovatka is the nearest rural locality.

References 

Rural localities in Kharabalinsky District